This is a complete and up to date list of all the events hosted by the Mixed Martial Arts promotion PFC.

Event list

Prospect Fighting Championships 15

Prospect Fighting Championships 15 or PFC 15, it was the 19th event of Prospect Fighting Championships and took place on March 5, 2023, at the Rebel Night club in Toronto, Ontario, Canada.

Results

Prospect Fighting Championships 14: Knockout Kidney Disease 3

Prospect Fighting Championships 14: Knockout Kidney Disease 3 or PFC 14, it was the 18th event of Prospect Fighting Championships and took place on October 22, 2022, at the Budweiser Gardens in London, Ontario, Canada.

Results

Prospect Fighting Championships 13: Unfinished Business 2

Prospect Fighting Championships 13: Unfinished Business 2 or PFC 13, it was the 17th event of Prospect Fighting Championships and took place on March 8, 2020, at the Rebel Night Club in Toronto, Ontario, Canada.

Results

Prospect Fighting Championships 12: Laramie vs. Cruz

Prospect Fighting Championships 12: Laramie vs. Cruz or PFC 12 was the 16th event of Prospect Fighting Championships and took place on September 28, 2019, at the St. Denis Centre in Windsor, Ontario, Canada.

Results

Prospect Fighting Championships 11: Knockout Kidney Disease 2

Prospect Fighting Championships 11: Knockout Kidney Disease 2 or PFC 11 was the 15th event of Prospect Fighting Championships and took place on September 28, 2019, at the Western Fair Agriplex in London, Ontario, Canada.

Results

Prospect Fighting Championships 10

Prospect Fighting Championships 10 or PFC 10 was the 14th event of Prospect Fighting Championships and took place on June 15, 2019, at the St. Denis Centre in Windsor, Ontario, Canada. The Promotion would return full-time to Professional MMA

Results

Prospect Fighting Championships 9

Prospect Fighting Championships 9 or PFC 9 was the 13th event of Prospect Fighting Championships and took place on July 14, 2018, at the Marconi Club in London, Ontario, Canada. This was 1 of 3 WAKO sanctioned Kickboxing events.

Results

Prospect Fighting Championships 8: Unfinished Business

Prospect Fighting Championships 8: Unfinished Business or PFC 8 was the 12th event of Prospect Fighting Championships and took place on February 17, 2018, at the Marconi Club in London, Ontario, Canada. This was 1 of 3 WAKO sanctioned Kickboxing events.

Results

Prospect Fighting Championships 7: Knockout Kidney Disease

Prospect Fighting Championships 7: Knockout Kidney Disease or PFC 7 was the 11th event of Prospect Fighting Championships and took place on October 7, 2017, at the Western Fair Agriplex in London, Ontario, Canada. This was 1 of 3 WAKO sanctioned Kickboxing events.

Results

Prospect Fighting Championships 6: Paddy Whacked

Prospect Fighting Championships 6: Paddy Whacked or PAFC 6 was the tenth event of Prospect Fighting Championships and took place on March 18, 2017, at the London Music Hall in London, Ontario, Canada.

Results

Prospect Fighting Championships 5: Deck The Halls With Beers And Brawls

Prospect Fighting Championships 5: Deck The Halls With Beers And Brawls or PAFC 5 was the ninth event of Prospect Fighting Championships and took place on December 4, 2016, at the London Music Hall in London, Ontario, Canada.

Results

Prospect Fighting Championships 4

Prospect Fighting Championships 4 or PAFC 4 was the eighth event of Prospect Fighting Championships and took place on August 13, 2016, at the London Music Hall in London, Ontario, Canada.

Results

Prospect Fighting Championships 3

Prospect Fighting Championships 3 or PAFC 3 was the seventh event of Prospect Fighting Championships and took place on March 5, 2016, at the Cowboys Ranch in London, Ontario, Canada.

Results

Prospect Fighting Championships 2

Prospect Fighting Championships 2 or PAFC 2 was the sixth event of Prospect Fighting Championships and took place on December 8, 2015, at the Cowboys Ranch in London, Ontario, Canada.

Results

Prospect Fighting Championships 1

Prospect Fighting Championships 1 or PAFC 1 was the fifth event of Prospect Fighting Championships and took place on August 29, 2015, at the Cowboys Ranch in London, Ontario, Canada. First event after rebranding to Prospect FC.

Results

Provincial Fighting Championship 4

Provincial Fighting Championship 4 was the fourth event planned by Prospect Fighting Championships it was to take place on April 25, 2015, in Windsor Ontario, Canada but the event was cancelled.

Provincial Fighting Championship 3: Showdown In The Downtown

Provincial Fighting Championship 3: Showdown In The Downtown was the third event of Prospect Fighting Championships and took place on October 18, 2014, at the Budweiser Gardens in London, Ontario, Canada.

Results

Provincial Fighting Championship 2

Provincial Fighting Championship 2 was the second event of Prospect Fighting Championships and took place on March 8, 2014. at the Western Fair Agriplex in London, Ontario, Canada.
 
Results

Provincial Fighting Championship 1: Unrivaled

Provincial Fighting Championship 1: Unrivaled was the inaugural event of Prospect Fighting Championships and took place on October 26, 2013. at the Western Fair Agriplex in London, Ontario, Canada.

Results

References

External links
 

Events
Mixed martial arts events lists